The Barbie Fashion Model Collection is a line of dolls introduced in 2000. The collection features dolls aimed at the adult collector, and is primarily sold via the Barbiecollector.com website and online retailers. The dolls in the collection are all made from a material called Silkstone, a durable material that simulates the weight and feel of porcelain dolls.

Product & History
The dolls in the series were all designed by veteran doll designer Robert Best, taking inspiration from the world of fashion to create the high end clothes worn by the dolls.

To date, all of the female dolls have featured the 1993 resculpt of the original Barbie face from 1959, with updated facial screening and a variety of skin tones, hair colors, and fashion ensembles. The collection has also featured the Ken character, and as of 2011, the Francie character. In 2010, a line of dolls based on characters from the AMC television drama Mad Men were produced.

The collection celebrated its 20th anniversary with one final doll to end the series on August 10, 2020 with a Platinum Label doll known as the Gala's Best, designed yet again by Robert Best with an articulated silkstone body and a high quality tulle gown.

References 

Fashion Model Collection